Braxton Stone-Papadopoulos (born June 23, 1995) is a Canadian wrestler. She won a bronze medal at the 2014 Commonwealth Games. She has been in competition with fellow world champion teammate Justine Bouchard. She has been ranked number 2 in the world.

Early life

She initially earned a black belt in taekwondo by age 10. She started wrestling at age 10 and was coached initially by her uncle Stan Tzogas who had coached at the Olympic level.

Career 

She won the bronze medal at the 2014 Commonwealth Games. Following the games, she made the decision to move up a weight class to 63-kg after she experienced difficulty reaching the 58-kg weight limit.

At the 2015 Pan American Games she won the gold medal in 63 kg category, defeating Katerina Vidiaux of Cuba 7-3.

In September 2015 Stone-Papadopoulos qualified a quota for Canada for the 2016 Olympic Games in Rio de Janeiro after placing fifth in the 63 kg category at the senior world championships. Ultimately, she was not selected to compete for the country at the 2016 Games.

In 2017, she won a silver medal at the 2017 World U23 Wrestling Championship in the 63 kg category. She defeated Petra Olli, Germany's Luzie Manzke and Moa Nygren of Sweden en route to the gold medal match, where she lost due to a last-moment throw by the winner, Ayana Gempei of Japan.

References 

1995 births
Canadian female sport wrestlers
Living people
Wrestlers at the 2014 Commonwealth Games
Wrestlers at the 2015 Pan American Games
Black Canadian sportspeople
Commonwealth Games bronze medallists for Canada
Pan American Games gold medalists for Canada
Commonwealth Games medallists in wrestling
Pan American Games medalists in wrestling
Sportspeople from Scarborough, Toronto
Medalists at the 2015 Pan American Games
Pan American Wrestling Championships medalists
Black Canadian sportswomen
20th-century Canadian women
21st-century Canadian women
Medallists at the 2014 Commonwealth Games